Pas Poshteh (also known as Pas Poshteh Barvānlū, Pa yi Pusht, and Pāy Poshteh) is a village in Bizaki Rural District, Golbajar District, Chenaran County, Razavi Khorasan Province, Iran. At the 2006 census, its population was 506, in 126 families.

References 

Populated places in Chenaran County